Tallon Griekspoor was the defending champion but chose not to defend his title.

Tseng Chun-hsin won the title after defeating Norbert Gombos 6–4, 6–1 in the final.

Seeds

Draw

Finals

Top half

Bottom half

References

External links
Main draw
Qualifying draw

Murcia Open - 1